A drum kit (also called a drum set, trap set, or simply drums) is a collection of drums, cymbals, and sometimes other auxiliary percussion instruments set up to be played by one person. The player (drummer) typically holds a pair of matching drumsticks, one in each hand, and uses their feet to operate a foot-controlled hi-hat and bass drum pedal.  

A standard kit may contain:
 A snare drum, mounted on a stand
 A bass drum, played with a beater moved by a foot-operated pedal
 One or more tom-toms, including rack toms and/or floor toms 
 One or more cymbals, including a ride cymbal and crash cymbal
 Hi-hat cymbals, a pair of cymbals that can be manipulated by a foot-operated pedal

The drum kit is a part of the standard rhythm section and is used in many types of popular and traditional music styles, ranging from rock and pop to blues and jazz.


History

Early development

Before the development of the drum set, drums and cymbals used in military and orchestral music settings were played separately by different percussionists; if the score called for bass drum, triangle and cymbals, three percussionists would be hired to play these three instruments. In the 1840s, percussionists began to experiment with foot pedals as a way to enable them to play more than one instrument, but these devices would not be mass-produced for another 75 years. By the 1860s, percussionists started combining multiple drums into a set. The bass drum, snare drum, cymbals, and other percussion instruments were all struck with hand-held drumsticks. Drummers in musical theater shows and stage shows, where the budget for pit orchestras was often limited, contributed to the creation of the drum set by developing techniques and devices that would enable them to cover the roles of multiple percussionists.

Double-drumming was developed to enable one person to play the bass and snare with sticks, while the cymbals could be played by tapping the foot on a "low-boy". With this approach, the bass drum was usually played on beats one and three (in  time). While the music was first designed to accompany marching soldiers, this simple and straightforward drumming approach led to the birth of ragtime music when the simplistic marching beats became more syncopated. This resulted in a greater swing and dance feel. The drum set was initially referred to as a "trap set", and from the late 1800s to the 1930s, drummers were referred to as "trap drummers". By the 1870s, drummers were using an "overhang pedal". Most drummers in the 1870s preferred to do double-drumming without any pedal to play multiple drums, rather than use an overhang pedal. Companies patented their pedal systems such as that of drummer Edward "Dee Dee" Chandler of New Orleans 1904–05. Liberating the hands for the first time, this evolution saw the bass drum played with the foot of a standing percussionist (thus the term "kick drum"). The bass drum became the central piece around which every other percussion instrument would later revolve.

William F. Ludwig, Sr., and his brother, Theobald Ludwig, founded the Ludwig & Ludwig Co. in 1909 and patented the first commercially successful bass drum pedal system, paving the way for the modern drum kit. 

Soon it became apparent that the drum's sound overpowered other instruments on stage. In 1912, drummers replaced sticks with wire brushes, and later, metal fly swatters. Drummers could still play the rudimentary snare figures and grooves with brushes that they would normally play with drumsticks.

20th century
By World War I, drum kits were often marching band-style military bass drums with many percussion items suspended on and around them. Drum kits became a central part of jazz, especially Dixieland. The modern drum kit was developed in the vaudeville era during the 1920s in New Orleans.

In 1917, a New Orleans band called "The Original Dixieland Jazz Band" recorded jazz tunes that became hits all over the country. These were the first official jazz recordings. Drummers such as Baby Dodds, Zutty Singleton and Ray Bauduc had taken the idea of marching rhythms, combining the bass drum and snare drum and "traps", a term used to refer to the percussion instruments associated with immigrant groups, which included miniature cymbals, tom toms, cowbells and woodblocks. They started incorporating these elements with ragtime, which had been popular for a couple of decades, creating an approach which evolved into a jazz drumming style.

Budget constraints and space considerations in musical theatre pit orchestras led bandleaders to pressure fewer percussionists to cover more percussion parts. Metal consoles were developed to hold Chinese tom-toms, with swing-out stands for snare drums and cymbals. On top of the console was a "contraption" tray (shortened to "trap"), used to hold items like whistles, klaxons and cowbells, so these drums/kits were dubbed "trap kits". Hi-hat stands became available around 1926.

In 1918 Baby Dodds, playing on riverboats with Louis Armstrong on the Mississippi, modified the military marching setup, experimenting with playing the drum rims instead of woodblocks, hitting cymbals with sticks (1919) (which was not yet common), and adding a side cymbal above the bass drum (what became known as the ride cymbal). Drum maker William Ludwig developed the "sock" or early low-mounted high-hat after observing Dodd's drumming. Ludwig noticed that Dodd tapped his left foot all the time. Dodds asked Ludwig to raise the newly produced low hats nine inches higher to make it easier to play, thus creating the modern hi-hat cymbal. Dodds was one of the first drummers to play the broken-triplet beat that became the standard pulse and roll of modern ride cymbal playing. He also popularized the use of Chinese cymbals. Recording technology was crude, which meant that loud sounds could distort the recording. In order to get around this, Dodds used woodblocks and the drums as quieter alternatives to cymbals and drum skins respectively.

In the 1920s, freelance drummers were hired to play at shows, concerts, theaters, clubs and to support dancers and musicians of various genres. Some drummers in the 1920s worked as foley artists. During silent films, an orchestra was hired to accompany the silent film, and the drummer was responsible for providing all the sound effects. Drummers played instruments to imitate gun shots, planes flying overhead, a train coming into a train station, galloping horses, etc.

Sheet music from the 1920s provides evidence that the drummer's sets were starting to evolve in size and sound to support the various acts mentioned above. However, by 1930, "talkies" (films with audio) were more popular, and many were accompanied with pre-recorded soundtracks. This technological breakthrough put thousands of drummers who served as sound effect specialists out of work. A similar panic was felt by drummers in the 1980s, when electronic drum machines were first released.

Playing

Grooves

Kit drumming, whether playing accompaniment of voices and other instruments or doing a drum solo, consists of two elements:
 A groove which sets the basic time-feel and provides a rhythmic framework for the song (examples include a backbeat or shuffle).
 Drum fills and other ornaments and variations which provide variety and add interest to the drum sound. Fills could include a sting at the end of a musical section or act as a drum showpiece.

Fills

A fill is a departure from the repetitive rhythm pattern in a song. A drum fill can be used to "fill in" the space between the end of one verse and the beginning of another verse or chorus. Fills vary from a simple few strokes on a tom or snare, to a distinctive rhythm played on the hi-hat, to sequences several bars long that are short virtuosic drum solos. As well as adding interest and variation to the music, fills serve an important function in preparing and indicating significant changes of sections in songs and linking sections. A vocal cue is a short drum fill that introduces a vocal entry. A fill ending with a cymbal crash on beat one is often used to lead into a chorus or verse.

Drum solos

A drum solo is an instrumental section that highlights the virtuosity, skill and musical creativity of the drummer. While other instrument solos such as guitar solos are typically accompanied by the other rhythm section instruments (e.g., bass guitar and electric guitar), for most drum solos, all the band members stop playing so that all of the audience's focus will be on the drummer. In some drum solos, the other rhythm section instrumentalists may play "punches" at certain pointssudden, loud chords of a short duration. Drum solos are common in jazz, but they are also used in several rock genres, such as heavy metal and progressive rock. During drum solos, drummers have a degree of creative freedom that allows them to employ complex polyrhythms that would otherwise be unsuitable with an ensemble. In live concerts, drummers may be given extended drum solos, even in genres where drum solos are rare on singles.

Grip

Most drummers hold the drumsticks in one of two types of grip:
 Traditional grip (originally developed for playing side drum in marching ensembles where the sticks are most commonly held with an overhand grip for the right hand and an underhand grip for the left).
 Matched grip (in which both sticks are held the same way).

Components

Drums

Bass drum

The bass drum (also known as the "kick drum") is the lowest-pitched drum and usually provides the beat or timing element with basic pulse patterns. Some drummers may use two or more bass drums or use a double bass drum pedal on a single bass drum. Using a double bass drum pedal enables a drummer to play a double bass drum style with only one bass drum, saving space in recording/performance areas and reducing time and effort during set-up, taking down, and transportation. Double bass drumming is an important technique in certain genres, including heavy metal and progressive rock.

Snare drum

The snare drum is the heart of the drum kit, particularly in rock, due its utility of providing the backbeat. When applied in this fashion, it supplies strong regular accents, played by the left hand (if right-handed), and the backbone for many fills. Its distinctive sound can be attributed to the bed of stiff metal wires held under tension against the bottom head (known as the snare head). When the top head (known as the batter head) is struck with a drumstick, the snare wires, held under tension, vibrate, creating a snappy, staccato buzzing sound, along with the sound of the stick striking the batter head.

Toms

Tom-tom drums, or toms for short, are drums without snares and played with sticks (or whatever tools the music style requires) and are the most numerous drums in most kits. They provide the bulk of most drum fills and solos.

They include:
 Traditional double-headed rack toms, of varying diameters and depths
 Floor toms (generally the widest and largest toms, which also makes them the lowest-pitched toms)
 Single-headed concert toms
 Rototoms

The smallest and largest drums without snares, octobans and gong drums respectively, are sometimes considered toms. The naming of common configurations (four-piece, five-piece, etc.) is largely a reflection of the number of toms, as only the drums are conventionally counted, and these configurations all contain one snare and one or more bass drums, (though not regularly any standardized use of two bass/kick drums) the balance usually being in toms.

Other drums

Octobans are smaller toms designed for use in a drum kit, extending the tom range upwards in pitch, primarily by their depth; as well as diameter (typically 6"). Pearl brand octobans are called "rocket toms", and the instruments are also called tube toms.

Timbales are tuned much higher than a tom of the same diameter, typical use drum shells made of metal, and are normally played with very light, thin, non-tapered sticks. Timbales are more common in Latin music. They have relatively thin heads and a very different tone than a tom but are used by some drummers/percussionists to extend the tom range upwards. Alternatively, they can be fitted with tom heads and tuned as shallow concert toms.
Timbales were also used on occasion by Led Zeppelin drummer John Bonham.

Attack timbales and mini timbales are reduced-diameter timbales designed for drum kit usage, the smaller diameter allowing for thicker heads providing the same pitch and head tension. They are recognizable in 2010s genres and in more traditional forms of Latin, reggae & numerous world music styles.

Gong drums are a rare extension to a drum kit. The single-headed mountable drum appears similar to a bass drum (sizing around 20–24 inches in diameter) but is played with sticks rather than a foot-operated pedal and therefore has the same purpose as that of a floor tom.

Similarly, most hand drum percussion cannot be played easily or suitably with drumsticks without risking damage to the head and to the bearing edge, which is not protected by a metal drum rim, like a snare or tom. For use in a drum kit, they may be fitted with a metal drum head and played with care, or played by hand.

Cymbals

In most drum kits and drum/percussion kits cymbals are as important as the drums themselves. The oldest idiophones in music are cymbals, and were used throughout the ancient Near East, very early in the Bronze Age period. Cymbals are most associated with Turkey and Turkish craftsmanship, where Zildjian (the name means cymbal smith) has predominantly made them since 1623.

While most drummers purchase cymbals individually, beginner cymbal packs were brought to market to provide entry-level cymbals for the novice drummer. The kits normally contain four cymbals: one ride, one crash, and a pair of hi-hats. A few contain only three cymbals, using a crash/ride instead of the separate ride and crash. The sizes closely follow those given in Common configurations below.

Most drummers extend this by adding another crash, a splash, a china/effects cymbal; or even all of those last mentioned.

Ride cymbal

The ride cymbal is most often used for keeping a constant-rhythm pattern, every beat or more often, as the music requires. Development of this ride technique is generally credited to Baby Dodds.

Most drummers have a single main ride, located near their right (or dominant) handwithin easy playing reach, as it is used very regularlyoften a 20" to 22" diameter sizing but 16"-26" diameters are not uncommon. It is usually a medium-heavy to heavy-weighted cymbal that cuts through other instrumental sounds, but some drummers use a swish cymbal, sizzle cymbal or other exotic or lighter metal ride, as the main or only ride in their kit, particularly for jazz, gospel or ballad/folk sounds. In the 1960s Ringo Starr of the Beatles used a sizzle cymbal as a second ride, particularly during guitar solos.

Hi-hats

The hi-hat cymbals (nicknamed "hats") consist of two cymbals mounted facing each other on a metal rod with folding support legs that keep a hollow support cylinder vertical. Like the bass drum, the hi-hat has a foot pedal. The bottom cymbal is fixed in place. The top cymbal is mounted on a thin rod, by means of a clutch, which is inserted into the hollow cymbal stand cylinder. The thin rod is connected to a foot pedal. When the foot pedal is pressed down, a mechanism causes the thin rod to move down, causing the upper cymbal to move. When the foot is lifted off the pedal, the upper cymbal rises, due to the pedal's spring-loaded mechanism. The hi-hats can be sounded by striking the cymbals with one or two sticks or just by opening and closing the cymbals with the foot pedal, without striking the cymbals. The ability to create rhythms on the hi-hats with the foot alone expands the drummer's ability to create sounds, as the hands are freed up to play on the drums or other cymbals. Different sounds can be created by striking "open hi-hats" (without the pedal depressed, which creates a noisy sound nicknamed "sloppy hats") or a crisp "closed hi-hats" sound (with the pedal pressed down). As well, the high hats can be played with a partially depressed pedal.

A unique effect can be created by striking an open hi-hat (i.e., in which the two cymbals are apart) and then closing the cymbals with the foot pedal; this effect is widely used in disco and funk. The hi-hat has a similar function to the ride cymbal. The two are rarely played consistently for long periods at the same time, but one or the other is used to keep what is known as the "ride rhythm" (e.g., eighth or sixteenth notes) much of the time in a song. The hi-hats are played by the right stick of a right-handed drummer. Changing between ride and hi-hat, or between either and a "leaner" sound with neither, is often used to mark a change from one song section to another, for example, to distinguish between a verse and chorus.

Crashes

The crash cymbals are usually the strongest accent markers within the kit, marking crescendos and climaxes, vocal entries, and major changes of mood/swells and effects. A crash cymbal is often accompanied by a strong kick on the bass drum pedal, both for musical effect and to support the stroke. It provides a fuller sound and is a commonly taught technique.

In the very smallest kits, in jazz, and at very high volumes, ride cymbals may be played in with the technique and sound of a crash cymbal. Some hi-hats will also give a useful crash, particularly thinner hats or those with an unusually severe taper. At low volumes, producing a good crash from a cymbal not particularly suited to it is a highly skilled art. Alternatively, specialized crash/ride and ride/crash cymbals are specifically designed to combine both functions.

Other cymbals

Effects cymbals

All cymbals other than rides, hi-hats and crashes/splashes are usually called effects cymbals when used in a drum kit, though this is a non-classical or colloquial designation that has become a standardized label. Most extended kits include one or more splash cymbals and at least one china cymbal. Major cymbal makers produce cymbal extension packs consisting of one splash and one china, or more rarely a second crash, a splash and a china, to match some of their starter packs of ride, crash and hi-hats. However any combination of options can be found in the marketplace.

Some cymbals may be considered effects in some kits but "basic" in another set of components. A swish cymbal may, for example serve, as the main ride in some styles of music, but in a larger kit, which includes a conventional ride cymbal as well, it may well be considered an effects cymbal per se. Likewise, Ozone crashes have the same purpose as a standard crash cymbal, but are considered to be effects cymbals due to their rarity, and the holes cut into them, which provide a darker, more resonant attack.

Accent cymbals
Cymbals of any type used to provide an accent rather than a regular pattern or groove are known as accent cymbals. While any cymbal can be used to provide an accent, the term is applied more correctly to cymbals for which the main purpose is to provide an accent. Accent cymbals include chime cymbals, small-bell domed cymbals or those with a clear sonorous/oriental chime to them like specialized crash and splash cymbals and many china types too, particularly the smaller or thinner ones.

Low-volume cymbals
Low-volume cymbals are a specialty type of cymbal made to produce about 80% less volume than a typical cymbal. The entire surface of the cymbal is perforated by holes. Drummers use low-volume cymbals to play in small venues or as a way to practice without disturbing others.

Other acoustic instruments

Other instruments that have regularly been incorporated into drum kits include:
 Wood block and cowbell. These are traditional in classic rock. As well, they are used in culturally diverse forms of music
 Tambourine, particularly mounted on the hi-hat stand above the cymbals; an ordinary tambourine can be used, or a tambourine produced specially for drum kit use
 Timbales can be used to extend the range of tom-toms, particularly when the drummer owns them for other musical settings; a traditional timbale is tuned far higher than a tom of the same diameter, so the result is not always the most ideal
 Keyboard percussion instruments such a tubular bells or glockenspiel
 Gongs
 Triangles.
 Found objects, including spanners, brake drums, buckets, cardboard boxes, washboards, and jam and kerosene tins (anything ordinary that can be percussively struck to produce sounds, patterns and grooves for their setting)

See also Extended kits below.

Electronic drums

Electronic drums are used for many reasons. Some drummers use electronic drums for playing in small venues such as coffeehouses or church services, where a very low volume for the band is desired. Since fully electronic drums do not create any acoustic sound (apart from the quiet sound of the stick hitting the sensor pads), all of the drum sounds come from a keyboard amplifier or PA system; as such, the volume of electronic drums can be much lower than an acoustic kit. Some drummers use electronic drums as practice instruments, because they can be listened to with headphones, enabling a drummer to practice in an apartment or in the middle of the night without disturbing others. Some drummers use electronic drums to take advantage of the huge range of sounds that modern drum modules can produce, which range from sampled sounds of real drums, cymbals and percussion instruments (including instruments that would be impractical to take to a small gig, such as gongs or tubular bells), to electronic and synthesized sounds, including non-instrument sounds such as ocean waves.

A fully electronic kit is also easier to soundcheck than acoustic drums, assuming that the electronic drum module has levels that the drummer has pre-set in her/his practice room; in contrast, when an acoustic kit is sound checked, most drums and cymbals need to be miked and each mic needs to be tested by the drummer so its level and tone equalization can be adjusted by the sound engineer. As well, even after all the individual drum and cymbal mics are sound checked, the engineer needs to listen to the drummer play a standard groove, to check that the balance between the kit instruments is right. Finally, the engineer needs to set up the monitor mix for the drummer, which the drummer uses to hear her/his instruments and the instruments and vocals of the rest of the band. With a fully electronic kit, many of these steps could be eliminated.

Drummers' usage of electronic drum equipment can range from adding a single electronic pad to an acoustic kit (e.g., to have access to an instrument that might otherwise be impractical, such as a large gong), to using a mix of acoustic drums/cymbals and electronic pads, to using an acoustic kit in which the drums and cymbals have triggers, which can be used to sound electronic drums and other sounds, to having an exclusively electronic kit, which is often set up with the rubber or mesh drum pads and rubber "cymbals" in the usual drum kit locations. A fully electronic kit weighs much less and takes up less space to transport than an acoustic kit and it can be set up more quickly. One of the disadvantages of a fully electronic kit is that it may not have the same "feel" as an acoustic kit, and the drum sounds, even if they are high-quality samples, may not sound the same as acoustic drums.

Electronic drum pads are the second most widely used type of MIDI performance controllers, after electronic keyboards. Drum controllers may be built into drum machines, they may be standalone control surfaces (e.g., rubber drum pads), or they may emulate the look and feel of acoustic percussion instruments. The pads built into drum machines are typically too small and fragile to be played with sticks, and they are usually played with fingers. Dedicated drum pads such as the Roland Octapad or the DrumKAT are playable with the hands or with sticks and are often built to resemble the general form of a drum kit. There are also percussion controllers such as the vibraphone-style MalletKAT, and Don Buchla's Marimba Lumina.

As well as providing an alternative to a conventional acoustic drum kit, electronic drums can be incorporated into an acoustic drum kit to supplement it. MIDI triggers can also be installed into acoustic drum and percussion instruments. Pads that can trigger a MIDI device can be homemade from a piezoelectric sensor and a practice pad or other piece of foam rubber.

This is possible in two ways:
 Triggers are sensors that can be attached to acoustic drum kit components. In this way, an electronic drum sound will be produced when the instrument is played/struck, as well as the original sound voiced by the instrument being available, if so desired.
 Trigger pads can be mounted alongside other kit components. These pads make no significant acoustic sound themselves (if not modified to do otherwise), but are used purely to trigger the electronic sounds from the "drum brain". They are played with the same drum sticks as are used on other drum kit components.

In either case, an electronic control unit (sound module/"brain") with suitable sampled/modeled or synthesized drum sounds, amplification equipment (a PA system, keyboard amp, etc.) and stage monitor speakers are required for the drummer (and other band members and audience) to hear the electronically produced sounds. See Triggered drum kit.

A trigger pad could contain up to four independent sensors, each of them capable of sending information describing the timing and dynamic intensity of a stroke to the drum module/brain. A circular drum pad may have only one sensor for triggering, but a 2016-era cymbal-shaped rubber pad/cymbal will often contain two; one for the body and one for the bell at the center of the cymbal, and perhaps a cymbal choke trigger, to allow drummers to produce this effect.

Trigger sensors are most commonly used to replace the acoustic drum sounds, but they can often also be used effectively with an acoustic kit to augment or supplement an instrument's sound for the needs of the session or show. For example, in a live performance in a difficult acoustical space, a trigger may be placed on each drum or cymbal, and used to trigger a similar sound on a drum module. These sounds are then amplified through the PA system so the audience can hear them, and they can be amplified to any level without the risks of audio feedback or bleed problems associated with microphones and PAs in certain settings.

The sound of electronic drums and cymbals themselves is heard by the drummer and possibly other musicians in close proximity, but even so, the foldback (audio monitor) system is usually fed from the electronic sounds rather than the live acoustic sounds. The drums can be heavily dampened (made to resonate less or subdue the sound), and their tuning and even quality is less critical in the latter scenario. In this way, much of the atmosphere of the live performance is retained in a large venue, but without some of the problems associated with purely microphone-amplified drums. Triggers and sensors can also be used in conjunction with conventional or built-in microphones. If some components of a kit prove more difficult to mic than others (e.g., an excessively "boomy" low tom), triggers may be used on only the more difficult instruments, balancing out a drummer's/band's sound in the mix.

Trigger pads and drums, on the other hand, when deployed in a conventional set-up, are most commonly used to produce sounds not possible with an acoustic kit, or at least not with what is available. Any sound that can be sampled/recorded can be played when the pad is struck, by assigning the recorded sounds to specific triggers . Recordings or samples of barking dogs, sirens, breaking glass and stereo recordings of aircraft taking off and landing have all been used. Along with the more obvious electronically generated sounds there are synthesized human voices or song parts or even movie audio or digital video/pictures that (depending on device used) can also be played/triggered by electronic drums.

Virtual drums
Virtual drums are a type of audio software that simulates the sound of a drum kit using synthesized drum kit sounds or digital samples of acoustic drum sounds. Different drum software products offer a recording function, the ability to select from several acoustically distinctive drum kits (e.g., jazz, rock, metal), as well as the option to incorporate different songs into the session. Some software for the personal computer (PC) can turn any hard surface into a virtual drum kit using only one microphone.

Hardware

Hardware is the name given to the metal stands that support the drums, cymbals and other percussion instruments. Generally the term also includes the hi-hat pedal and clutch, and bass drum pedal or pedals, and the drum stool, but not the drum sticks.

Hardware is carried along with sticks and other accessories in the traps case, and includes:
 Cymbal stands
 Hi-hat stand
 Floor tom legs
 Tom-tom drum brackets or arms
 Snare drum stand
 Bass drum pedal or pedals
 Drum key
 Assorted accessories such as spare washers, cymbal sleeves, wire snare cords, washers for tension rods, etc.

Many or even all of the stands may be replaced by a drum rack, particularly useful for large drum kits.

Drummers often set up their own drum hardware onstage and adjust to their own comfort level. Major touring bands on tour will often have a drum tech who knows how to set up the drummer's hardware and instruments in the desired location and layout.

Common configurations

Drum kits are traditionally categorized by the number of drums, ignoring cymbals and other instruments. Snare, tom-tom and bass drums are always counted; other drums such as octobans may or may not be counted.

Traditionally, in America and the United Kingdom, drum sizes were expressed as depth x diameter, both in inches, but many drum kit manufacturers have since begun to express their sizes in terms of diameter x depth; still in the measure of inches. For example, a hanging tom 12 inches in diameter and 8 inches deep would be described by Tama as 8 inches × 12 inches, but by Pearl as 12 inches × 8 inches, and a standard diameter Ludwig snare drum 5 inches deep is a 5-inch × 14-inch, while the UK's Premier Manufacturer offers the same dimensions as: a 14-inch × 5-inch snare. The sizes of drums and cymbals given below are typical. Many drummers differ slightly or radically from them. Where no size is given, it is because there is too much variety to determine a typical size.

Three-piece
A three-piece drum set is the most basic set. A conventional three-piece kit consists of a bass drum, a 14" diameter snare drum, 12"–14" hi-hats, a single 12" diameter hanging tom, 8"–9" in depth, and a suspended cymbal, in the range of 14"–18", both mounted on the bass drum. These kits were common in the 1950s and 1960s and are still used in the 2010s in small acoustic dance bands. It is a common configuration for kits sold through mail order, and, with smaller sized drums and cymbals, for kits for children.

Four-piece

A four-piece kit extends the three-piece by adding one tom, either a second hanging tom mounted on the bass drum (a notable user is Chris Frantz of Talking Heads) and often displacing the cymbal, or by adding a floor tom. Normally another cymbal is added as well, so there are separate ride and crash cymbals, either on two stands, or the ride cymbal mounted on the bass drum to the player's right and the crash cymbal on a separate stand. The standard cymbal sizes are 16" crash and 18"–20" ride, with the 20" ride most common.

Four piece with floor tom
When a floor tom is added to make a four-piece kit, the floor tom is usually 14" for jazz, and 16" otherwise. This configuration is usually common in jazz and rock. Notable users include Ringo Starr in The Beatles, Mitch Mitchell in the Jimi Hendrix Experience, John Barbata in the Turtles and various jazz drummers throughout the 20th century, including Art Blakey, Buddy Rich and Jo Jones. For jazz, which normally emphasizes the use of ride cymbal for swing pattern, the lack of second hanging tom in a four-piece kit allows the cymbal to be positioned closer to the drummer, making them easier to be played.

If a second hanging tom is used, it is 10" diameter and 8" deep for fusion, or 13" diameter and one inch deeper than the 12" diameter tom. Otherwise, a 14" diameter hanging tom is added to the 12", both being 8" deep. In any case, both toms are most often mounted on the bass drum with the smaller of the two next to the hi-hats (on the left for a right-handed drummer). These kits are particularly useful for smaller venues where space is limited, such as coffeehouses, cafés, hotel lounges, and small pubs.

Five-piece

The five-piece kit is the full-size kit and the most common configuration used across various genres and styles. It adds a third tom to the four-piece kit, making three toms in all. A fusion kit will normally add a 14" tom, either a floor tom or a hanging tom on a stand to the right of the bass drum; in either case, making the tom lineup 10", 12" and 14". Having three toms enables drummers to have a low-pitched, middle-register and higher-pitched tom, which gives them more options for fills and solos.

Other kits will normally have 12" and 13" hanging toms plus either a 14" hanging tom on a stand, a 14" floor tom, or a 16" floor tom. In the 2010s, it is very popular to have 10" and 12" hanging toms, with a 16" floor tom. This configuration is often called a hybrid setup. The bass drum is most commonly 22" in diameter, but rock kits may use 24", fusion 20", jazz 18", and in larger bands up to 26". A second crash cymbal is common, typically an inch or two larger or smaller than the 16", with the larger of the two to the right for a right-handed drummer, but a big band may use crashes up to 20" and ride up to 24" or, very rarely, 26". A rock kit may also substitute a larger ride cymbal or larger hi-hats, typically 22" for the ride and 15" for the hats.

Most five-piece kits, at more than entry level, also have one or more effects cymbals. Adding cymbals beyond the basic ride, hi-hats and one crash configuration requires more stands in addition to the standard drum hardware packs. Because of this, many higher-cost kits for professionals are sold with little or even no hardware, to allow the drummer to choose the stands and also the bass drum pedal he/she prefers. At the other extreme, many inexpensive, entry-level kits are sold as a five-piece kit complete with two cymbal stands, most often one straight and one boom, and some even with a standard cymbal pack, a stool, and a pair of 5A drum sticks. In the 2010s, digital kits are often offered in a five-piece kit, usually with one plastic crash cymbal triggers and one ride cymbal trigger. Fully electronic drums do not produce any acoustic sound beyond the quiet tapping of sticks on the plastic or rubber heads. The trigger-pads are wired up to a synth module or sampler.

Small kits

If the toms are omitted completely, or the bass drum is replaced by a pedal-operated beater on the bottom skin of a floor tom and the hanging toms omitted, the result is a two-piece Cocktail drum kit, originally developed for Cocktail lounge acts. Such kits are particularly favored in musical genres such as trad jazz, bebop, rockabilly and jump blues. Some rockabilly kits and beginners kits for very young players omit the hi-hat stand. In rockabilly, this allows the drummer to play standing rather than seated. A very simple jazz kit for informal or amateur jam sessions consist of bass drum, snare drum and hi-hat, often with only a single cymbal (normally a ride, with or without sizzlers).

Although these kits may be small with respect to the number of drums used, the drums themselves are most often normal sizes, or even larger in the case of the bass drum. Kits using smaller drums in both smaller and larger configurations are also produced for particular uses, such as boutique kits designed to reduce the visual impact that a large kit creates or due space constraints in coffeehouses, travelling kits to reduce luggage volume, and junior kits for very young players. Smaller drums also tend to be quieter, again suiting smaller venues, and many of these kits extend this with extra muffling which allows quiet or even silent practice in a hotel room or bedroom.

Extended kits

Common extensions beyond these standard configurations include:
 Effects cymbals, particularly splash cymbals and china cymbals
 Double bass drums. Double bass drums or a double bass pedal are standard for some genres, particularly in heavy metal music
 Extra hanging or rack toms
 Extra crash cymbals
 A crash/ride cymbal in addition to the main ride
 A second, larger or smaller floor tom
 One or more octobans or a pair of timbales
 A second pair of hi-hats mounted as cable hats or x-hats
 Cymbal stacks
 Different types of gongs
 Multiple ride cymbals. A sizzle cymbal, thinner and larger than the main ride, was once common as a second ride or crash/ride, even in a four-piece kit, but is now less so (jazz drummers, however, may still have two or more ride cymbals, even in a small kit)
 Additional electronic sound module or sequencer.

See also other acoustic instruments above. Another versatile extension becoming increasingly common is the use of some electronic drums in a mainly conventional kit.

Less common extensions found particularly, but not exclusive to very large kits, include:
 Multiple snare drums, usually in the form of side snares. A side snare is usually positioned to the left of the drummer (opposite the floor toms and to the left of the hi hat). Side snares are used similarly to effects cymbals, when an additional and different sound is required. Generally only one side snare is used on a kit, if any at all.
 Multiple bass drums beyond the double bass drum setup
 Gong drums (single headed bass drums, played with sticks or mallets)
 Sets of gongs, tuned or untuned
 Sound effects such as a thunder sheet
 One or more crotales
 Instruments "borrowed" from orchestral percussion, such as timpani
 Instruments "borrowed" from marching band percussion, such as the tuned bass drums used in the drumline

Accessories

Sticks

Sticks were traditionally made from wood (particularly maple, hickory, and oak) but more recently metal, carbon fiber and other exotic materials have been used for high market end sticks. The prototypical wooden drum stick was primarily designed for use with the snare drum, and optimized for playing snare rudiments. Sticks come in a variety of weights and tip designs; 7N is a common jazz stick with a nylon tip, while a 5B is a common wood tipped stick, heavier than a 7N but with a similar profile, and a common standard for beginners. Numbers range from 1 (heaviest) to 10 (lightest).

The meanings of both numbers and letters vary from manufacturer to manufacturer, and some sticks are not described using this system at all, just being known as Smooth Jazz (typically a 7N or 9N) or Speed Rock (typically a 2B or 3B) for example. Many famous drummers endorse sticks made to their particular preference and sold under their signature.

Besides drumsticks, drummers will also use brushes and rutes in jazz and similar softer music. More rarely, other beaters such as cartwheel mallets (known to kit drummers as "soft sticks") may be used. It is not uncommon for rock drummers to use the "wrong" (butt) end of a stick for a heavier sound; some makers produce tipless sticks with two butt ends.

A stick bag is the standard way for a drummer to bring drumsticks to a live performance. For easy access, the stick bag is commonly mounted on the side of the floor tom, just within reach of the drummer's right hand for a right-handed drummer.

Muffles

Drum muffles are types of mutes that can reduce the ring, boomy overtone frequencies, or overall volume on a snare, bass, or tom. Controlling the ring is useful in studio or live settings when unwanted frequencies can clash with other instruments in the mix. There are internal and external muffling devices which rest on the inside or outside of the drumhead, respectively. Common types of mufflers include muffling rings, gels and duct tape, and improvised methods, such as placing a wallet near the edge of the head. Some drummers muffle the sound of a drum by putting a cloth over the drumhead.

Snare drum and tom-tom
Typical ways to muffle a snare or tom include placing an object on the outer edge of the drumhead. A piece of cloth, a wallet, gel, or fitted rings made of mylar are common objects. Also used are external clip-on muffles that work using the same principle. Internal mufflers that lie on the inside of the drumhead are often built into a drum, but are generally considered less effective than external muffles, as they stifle the initial tone, rather than simply reducing the sustain of it.

Bass drum
Muffling the bass can be achieved with the same muffling techniques as the snare, but bass drums in a drum kit are more commonly muffled by adding pillows, a sleeping bag or another soft filling inside the drum, between the heads. Cutting a small hole in the resonant head can also produce a more muffled tone, and allows manipulation in internally placed muffling. The Evans EQ pad places a pad against the batterhead and, when struck, the pad moves off the head momentarily, then returns to rest against the head, thus reducing the sustain without choking the tone.

Silencers/mutes
Another type of drum muffler is a piece of rubber that fits over the entire drumhead or cymbal. It interrupts contact between the stick and the head which dampens the sound even more. They are typically used in practice settings.

Cymbals are usually muted with the fingers or hand, to reduce the length or volume of ringing (e.g., the cymbal choke technique which is a key part of heavy metal drumming). Cymbals can also be muted with special rubber rings or duct tape.

Historical uses
Muffled drums are often associated with funeral ceremonies as well, such as the funerals of John F. Kennedy and Queen Victoria. The use of muffled drums has been written about by such poets as Henry Wadsworth Longfellow, John Mayne, and Theodore O'Hara. Drums have also been used for therapy and learning purposes, such as when an experienced player will sit with a number of students and by the end of the session have all of them relaxed and playing complex rhythms.

Stick holder
There are various types of stick holder accessories, including bags that can be attached to a drum and angled sheath-style stick holders, which can hold a single pair of sticks.

Sizzlers

A sizzler is a metal chain or combination of chains that is hung across a cymbal, creating a distinctive metallic sound when the cymbal is struck similar to that of a sizzle cymbal. Using a sizzler is the non-destructive alternative to drilling holes in a cymbal and putting metal rivets in the holes. Another benefit of using a "sizzler" chain is that the chain can be removed and the cymbal will return to its normal sound (in contrast, a cymbal with rivets would have to have the rivets removed).

Some sizzlers feature pivoting arms that allow the chains to be quickly raised from the cymbal, or lowered onto it, allowing the effect to be used for some songs and removed for others.

Cases

Three types of protective covers are common for kit drums:
 Drum bags are made from robust cloth such as cordura or from cloth-backed vinyl. They give minimal protection from bumps and impacts, but they do protect drums and cymbals from precipitation. They are adequate for drums transported in private vehicles to go to local gigs and sessions. They are often the only option for young drummers who are just starting out.
 Mid-price hard cases are of similar construction to suitcases, commonly made of fiber composite. The offer more protection from bumps than cloth bags.
 Flight cases or road cases are standard for professional touring drummers.

As with all musical instruments, the best protection is provided by a combination of a hard-shelled case with padding such as foam next to the drums and cymbals.

Microphones

Microphones ("mics") are used with drums to pick up the sound of the drums and cymbals for a sound recording and/or to pick up the sound of the drum kit so that it can be amplified through a PA system or sound reinforcement system. While most drummers use microphones and amplification in live shows in the 2010s, so that the sound engineer can adjust and balance the levels of the drums and cymbals, some bands that play in quieter genres of music and that play in small venues such as coffeehouses play acoustically, without mics or PA amplification. Small jazz groups such as jazz quartets or organ trios that are playing in a small bar will often just use acoustic drums. Of course if the same small jazz groups play on the mainstage of a big jazz festival, the drums will be miked so that they can be adjusted in the sound system mix. A middle-ground approach is used by some bands that play in small venues; they do not mic every drum and cymbal, but rather mic only the instruments that the sound engineer wants to be able to control in the mix, such as the bass drum and the snare.

In miking a drum kit, dynamic microphones, which can handle high sound-pressure levels, are usually used to close-mic drums, which is the predominant way to mic drums for live shows. Condenser microphones are used for overheads and room mics, an approach which is more common with sound recording applications. Close miking of drums may be done using stands or by mounting the microphones on the rims of the drums, or even using microphones built into the drum itself, which eliminates the need for stands for these microphones, reducing both clutter and set-up time, as well as isolating them.

In some styles of music, drummers use electronic effects on drums, such as individual noise gates that mute the attached microphone when the signal is below a threshold volume. This allows the sound engineer to use a higher overall volume for the drum kit by reducing the number of "active" mics which could produce unwanted feedback at any one time. When a drum kit is entirely miked and amplified through the sound reinforcement system, the drummer or the sound engineer can add other electronic effects to the drum sound, such as reverb or digital delay.

Some drummers arrive at the venue with their drum kit and use the mics and mic stands provided by the venue's sound engineer. Other drummers bring their all of their own mics, or selected mics (e.g., a good quality bass drum mic and a good mic for the snare) to ensure that they have good quality mics for each show. In bars and nightclubs, the microphones supplied by the venue can sometimes be in substandard condition, due to the heavy use they experience.

Monitors
Drummers using electronic drums, drum machines, or hybrid acoustic-electric kits (which blend traditional acoustic drums and cymbals with electronic pads) typically use a monitor speaker, keyboard amplifier or even a small PA system to hear the electronic drum sounds. Even a drummer playing entirely acoustic drums may use a monitor speaker to hear her drums, especially if she is playing in a loud rock or metal band, where there is substantial onstage volume from huge, powerful guitar stacks. Since the drum kit uses the deep bass drum, drummers are often given a large speaker cabinet with a 15" subwoofer to help them monitor their bass drum sound (along with a full-range monitor speaker to hear the rest of their kit). Some sound engineers and drummers prefer to use an electronic vibration system, colloquially known as a "butt shaker" or "throne thumper" to monitor the bass drum, because this lowers the stage volume. With a "butt shaker", the "thump" of each bass drum strike causes a vibration in the drum stool; this way the drummer feels their beat on the posterior, rather than hears it.

In-Ear Monitors are also popular among drummers since they also work as earplugs.

Bass drum gear
A number of accessories are designed for the bass drum (also called "kick drum"). Ported tubes for the bass drum are available to take advantage of the bass reflex speaker design, in which a tuned port (a hole and a carefully measured tube) are put in a speaker enclosure to improve the bass response at the lowest frequencies. Bass drumhead patches are available, which protect the drumhead from the impact of the felt beater. Bass drum pillows are fabric bags with filling or stuffing that can be used to alter the tone or resonance of the bass drum. A less expensive alternative to using a specialized bass drum pillow is to use an old sleeping bag.

Gloves
Some drummers wear special drummer's gloves to improve their grip on the sticks when they play. Drumming gloves often have a textured grip surface made of a synthetic or rubber material and mesh or vents on the parts of the glove not used to hold sticks, to ventilate perspiration.

Drum screen

In some styles or settings, such as country music clubs or churches, small venues, or when a live recording is being made, the drummer may use a transparent Perspex or Plexiglas drum screen (also known as a drum shield) to dampen the onstage volume of the drums. A screen that completely surrounds the drum kit is known as a drum booth. In live sound applications, drum shields are used so that the audio engineer can have more control over the volume of drums that the audience hears through the PA system mix or to reduce the overall volume of the drums, as a way to reduce the overall volume of the band in the venue. In some recording studios, foam and fabric baffles are used in addition to or in place of clear panels. The drawback with foam/cloth baffle panels is that the drummer cannot see other performers, the record producer or the audio engineer well.

Carpets
Drummers often bring a carpet, mats or rugs to venues to prevent the bass drum and hi-hat stand from "crawling" (moving away) on a slippery surface from the drum head striking the bass drum. The carpet also reduces short reverberation (which is generally but not always an advantage), and helps to prevent damage to the flooring or floor coverings. In shows where multiple drummers will bring their kits onstage over the night, it is common for drummers to mark the location of their stands and pedals with tape, to allow for quicker positioning of a kits in a drummer's accustomed position. Bass drums and hi-hat stands commonly have retractable spikes to help them to grip surfaces such as carpet, or stay stationary (on hard surfaces) with rubber feet.

Practice equipment
Drummers use a variety of accessories when practicing. Metronomes and beat counters are used to develop a sense of a steady pulse. Drum muffling pads may be used to lessen the volume of drums during practicing. A practice pad, held on the lap, on a leg, or mounted on a stand, is used for near-silent practice with drumsticks. A set of practice pads mounted to simulate an entire drum kit is known as a practice kit. In the 2010s, these have largely been superseded by electronic drums, which can be listened to with headphones for quiet practice and kits with non-sounding mesh heads.

Tuning equipment

Drummers use a drum key for tuning their drums and adjusting some drum hardware. Besides the basic type of drum key (a T-handled wrench) there are various tuning wrenches and tools. Basic drum keys are divided in three types which allows tuning of three types of tuning screws on drums: square (most used), slotted and hexagonal. Ratchet-type wrenches allow high-tension drums to be tuned easily. Spin keys (utilizing a ball joint) allow rapid head changing. Torque-wrench type keys are available, graphically revealing the torque at each lug. Also, tension gauges, or meters, which are set on the head, aid drummers to achieve a consistent tuning. Drummers can tune drums "by ear" or, in the 2010s, use a digital drum tuner, which "measures tympanic pressure" on the drumhead to provide accurate tuning.

Notation and improvisation

Drum kit music is either written down in music notation (called "drum parts"), learned and played by ear, improvised, or some combination of some or all three of these methods. Professional session musician drummers and big band drummers are often required to read drum parts. Drum parts are most commonly written on a standard five-line staff. In 2016, a special percussion clef is used, while previously the bass clef was used. However, even if the bass or no clef is used, each line and space is assigned an instrument of the kit, rather than to a pitch. In jazz, traditional music, folk music, rock music, and pop music, drummers are expected to be able to learn songs by ear (from a recording or from another musician who is playing or singing the song) and improvise. The degree of improvisation differs in different styles. Jazz and jazz fusion drummers may have lengthy improvised solos in every song. In rock music and blues, there are also drum solos in some songs, although they tend to be shorter than those in jazz. Drummers in all popular music and traditional music styles are expected to be able to improvise accompaniment parts to songs, once they are told the genre or style (e.g., shuffle, ballad, blues).

Recording
On early recording media (until 1925) such as wax cylinders and discs carved with an engraving needle, sound balancing meant that musicians had to be moved back in the room. Drums were often put far from the horn (part of the mechanical transducer) to reduce sound distortion.

In the 2020s, drum parts in many popular music styles are often recorded apart from the other instruments and singers, using multitrack recording techniques. Once the drums are recorded, the other instruments (rhythm guitar, piano, etc.) and then vocals are added. To ensure that the drum tempo is consistent in this type of recording, the drummer usually plays along with a click track (a type of digital metronome) in headphones. As such, the ability to play accurately along with a click track has become an important skill for professional drummers.

Drum manufacturers
Manufacturers using the American traditional format in their catalogs include these:
 ddrum
 Camco
 Drum Workshop
 Gretsch Drums
 Ludwig-Musser
 Slingerland Drum Company
 Tama Drums
Those using the European measures of diameter x depth include these:
 Brady Drum Company
 Mapex Drums
 Meinl Percussion
 Pearl Drums
 Premier Percussion
 Rogers Drums
 Sonor
 Yamaha Drums

See also

People
 Drummer
 List of drummers

Styles and techniques
 Drum beat
 Jazz drumming

Other

Notes

References

External links

 "History of the Drum Set" with Daniel Glass on YouTube

 
Drumming
19th-century percussion instruments
Membranophones
Cymbals
North American percussion instruments
Drums
Jazz instruments
Blues instruments
Rock music instruments
Folk music instruments
Rockabilly instruments
 
Rhythm section
Occupations in music
Electronic musical instruments